Neoplasms of the nailbed may often present with paronychia, ingrown nail, onycholysis, pyogenic granuloma, nail-plate dystrophy, longitudinal erythronychia, bleeding, and discolorations.  There are various benign and malignant neoplasms that may occur in or overlying the nail matrix and in the nailbed, and symptoms may include pain, itching, and throbbing.

Benign tumors of the nails include verruca, pyogenic granuloma, fibromas, nevus cell nevi, myxoid cysts, angiofibromas (Koenen tumors), and epidermoid cysts.

Squamous cell carcinoma of the nailbed is uncommon, and often mistaken for a pyogenic granuloma initially.  Subungual melanoma is frequently diagnosed late in the course of growth.

References

 

Conditions of the skin appendages